The Singapore Selection XI is a football team made up of Singapore internationals and selected players from the S.League. The team mainly plays in exhibition matches and non-FIFA 'A' international matches. In 2013, the Singapore Selection XI, coached by V. Sundramoorthy played against Atlético Madrid in the Peter Lim Charity Cup and they lost 0–2. In 2014, the team played against Juventus F.C. at the new National Stadium, Singapore and lost 0–5. The team participated in the Barclays Asia Trophy in July 2015.

Results and upcoming fixtures

Squad 
As of 3 July 2015 for the 2015 Premier League Asia Trophy.

SOS Cup 
As of 6 May 2017 for the 2017 Sultan of Selangor Cup. Jordan Webb was called up as a replacement after Stipe Plazibat suffered a calf injury.

References 

Football in Singapore